"The Visitors" (originally "Den första", meaning "The First"), also known as "The Visitors (Crackin' Up)", is a 1981 song by the Swedish pop group ABBA. It is the title track from the band's studio album of the same name, and was released as the fourth and final single in April 1982. The lead vocal was performed by Anni-Frid Lyngstad.

Meaning
The official stated theme is a protest against the mistreatment of political dissidents in the Soviet Union at the time, as ABBA seemed to put political issues into their lyrics in the final days of the group. Björn Ulvaeus has stated that at the time of release he preferred that the song should have a sense of mystery so did not explain the exact meaning.

In 1982, the album The Visitors was banned in the Soviet Union, possibly due to the band allowing a video of "When All Is Said and Done" to be shown in the United States Information Agency television special, Let Poland Be Poland, along with a spoken message from Ulvaeus and Benny Andersson, broadcast via satellite around the world on 31 January 1982. The show, which also featured Frank Sinatra, Paul McCartney, Orson Welles, Henry Fonda, UK Prime Minister Margaret Thatcher and US President Ronald Reagan, was a public protest against the then-recent imposition of martial law in Poland. However, ABBA's segment was not included in the broadcast, the official reason given being time restraints. However, it is likely that the segment was omitted because Ulvaeus and Andersson exemplified, in addition to Poland, US-supported dictatorships Chile and El Salvador as countries where citizens' human rights are routinely violated.

Reception
"The Visitors" was released as the album's second (and final) single in the US instead of "Head over Heels," which remained as the B-side.

The single peaked just outside the Top 60 at No. 63 on the singles chart in the U.S., and a double A-sided "The Visitors/When All Is Said and Done" 12" single reached No. 8 on the Billboard dance chart.  The song was also remixed by Greg Silva subscription DJ remix service, Hot Tracks, into a much longer version that brought additional club play.  This was the single most-requested remix by Hot Tracks, and was featured in Volume One of The Best of Hot Tracks. AllMusic reviewer Bruce Eder retrospectively described the song as "a topical song about Soviet dissidents that also manages to be very catchy." Even though the song did not have any success in some countries, "The Visitors" was No. 1 in Costa Rica.

Personnel 

 Anni-Frid Lyngstad – lead vocals
 Agnetha Fältskog - backing vocals
 Björn Ulvaeus – guitar, backing vocals
 Benny Andersson – keyboards, synthesizer

Charts

References

External links
"The Visitors" / "When All Is Said and Done" U.S. 12" release info Discogs

1982 singles
ABBA songs
Polar Music singles
Songs written by Benny Andersson and Björn Ulvaeus
1981 songs
Protest songs